O Chinadana is a 2002 Indian Telugu-language romantic comedy film directed by  E Sathi Babu starring Srikanth, Raja, Gajala, Asha Saini and Sruthi Raj. The film was produced by Mullapudi Brahmanandam for Rajeswari Films. The film was a box office success. The main theme of the film was taken from the Hollywood film 10 Things I Hate About You (1999).

Plot 
Ramya falls in fall in love with Srinivasa "Seenu" Sastry, but her elder sister, Divya hates love because of her childhood friend Rajesh. The lovers plot and introduce Narasimha, a thief as Rajesh, the childhood friend to lure Divya. Rest is how the pairs marry.

Cast 
 Srikanth as Narasimha / fake Rajesh 
 Raja as Srinivasa "Seenu" Sastry
 Shruthi Raj as Divya Reddy
 Gajala as Ramya Reddy
 Asha Saini as Chamanthi
 Jaya Prakash Reddy as Major Rajasekhar Reddy
 Brahmanandam as Hyderabad/Secunderabad 
 Ali as Ali
 Kovai Sarala as Veena Tantula Meera Bai
 Tanikella Bharani as Lawyer Avadhani
 Brahmaji as Rajes
 Kota Srinivasa Rao as SI Kotayya
 Babu Mohan as Bhadrayya
 Benarjee

Soundtrack 
The film's soundtrack was composed by Vidyasagar and the lyrics were written by Sirivennela Seetharama Sastry.

References 

2000s Telugu-language films
Indian romantic comedy films
2002 films
2002 romantic comedy films
Films directed by E. Satti Babu